Daniil Trifonov is a Russian pianist and composer. His commercial discography includes releases on such labels as Decca Classics and Deutsche Grammophon. This article is a non-exhaustive list of his recorded performances, including non-commercial releases. This list includes live performances of piano concertos, mainly of Russian composers, with such conductors as Valery Gergiev, which were broadcast by radio stations such as BBC and Radio France as well as by the video streaming platform Medici.tv.

Recordings

See also 
 Daniil Trifonov discography

References 

Trifonov, Daniil